"My Island Home" is a rock song written by Neil Murray and George Burarrwanga. It was originally performed by the Warumpi Band. The song references lead singer's (George Burarrwanga) home up at Elcho Island off the coast of Arnhem Land in the Northern Territory. It was recorded in 1986 and released as a single from their second album, Go Bush, in January 1987. 

It was covered by Christine Anu in 1995; she had been a backing vocalist in Neil Murray and The Rainmakers during 1992–1993.

"My Island Home" won 'Song of the Year' at the 1995 Australasian Performing Right Association (APRA) Awards for Anu's reworked version of the song. It was also listed in the APRA Top 30 Australian songs of all time in 2001.

Warumpi Band version
Neil Murray, vocalist and guitarist for Warumpi Band, recalls writing the song:

It was first recorded in 1986 and released on the Warumpi Band's second album Go Bush by Parole Records in 1987. Rrurrumbu would later record a version of it in the Gumatj language for his debut solo album Nerbu Message.

Christine Anu version

In January 1995, Christine Anu released a version of the song as the second single from her debut studio album, Stylin' Up. Anu, a Torres Strait Islander, changed some lyrics to reflect her circumstances. e.g.: Rather than moving to the desert, she compares island life to the city life, and from the point of view of a woman. In the music video, it intercedes between her singing, and an Aboriginal man deciding to drop his job as a cleaner, and start running through the city, the desert, and finally to the ocean. When he gets there, he swims to his home island and waves at his kid and wife.

At the 1995 APRA Awards, "My Island Home" won Song of the Year. At the ARIA Music Awards of 1995, "Island Home" was nominated for ARIA Award for Song of the Year, but lost to "Chains" by Tina Arena.

Despite peaking at number 67 on the Australian singles chart, it spent 20 weeks on the national top 100 chart.  The song was voted at number 47 in the Triple J Hottest 100, 1995.

Anu performed the song at the closing ceremony of the 2000 Summer Olympics  and at opening ceremony of the 2000 Summer Paralympics in Sydney. The song was also listed in APRA Top 30 Australian songs of all time in 2001.

Anu re-recorded the song for her second album Come My Way in 2000, subtitled "Earth Beat" version, which removed the echoed effects during the choruses, but added subtle synth effects and more prominent guitar during the song, making it sound more rhythmic and polished, whereas the original was driven more with a drum beat.

In 2016, Anu's rendition was inducted into the  National Film and Sound Archive's Sounds of Australia.

In 2018, Anu performed the song at the opening ceremony of the 2018 Commonwealth Games in Gold Coast.

Charts

Tiddas
Aboriginal band Tiddas has also recorded a version of the song for the Radiance soundtrack.

References

Australian patriotic songs
1987 songs
1995 singles
Christine Anu songs
Warumpi Band songs
APRA Award winners
ARIA Award winners
Indigenous Australian culture